Odile van Aanholt (born 14 January 1998) is a Dutch sailor who was the 2021 49er FX World Champion.

Early life 
van Aanholt was born in Curaçao and grew up with four siblings who all sail.

Sailing career 
In 2013, at the age of 14, van Aanholt was the South American Optimist champion, and she took second place in the 2014 Youth Olympic Games. Sailing World detailed her training in the Persico 69F in preparation for the 2021 Youth America's Cup in Auckland. van Aanholt also sails in the 49erFX, starting first with Marieke Jongens. She is, with Elise de Ruijter, the 2021 49er FX World Champion and 49er FX European Champion.

References

External links
 

1998 births
Living people
Dutch female sailors (sport)
49er FX class sailors
49er FX class world champions
Sailors at the 2014 Summer Youth Olympics
20th-century Dutch women
21st-century Dutch women